The 1994–95 League of Ireland Premier Division was the 10th season of the League of Ireland Premier Division. The division was made up of 12 teams. Dundalk F.C. won the title.

Regular season
This season saw the league revert to the format of each team playing three rounds of games, playing every other team three times.

Final table

Results

Matches 1–22

Matches 23–33

Promotion/relegation play-off
Athlone Town who finished in tenth place played off against Finn Harps F.C., the third placed team from the 1994–95 League of Ireland First Division.

1st Leg

2nd Leg

Athlone Town won 5–3 on penalties and retain their place in the Premier Division

See also
 1994–95 League of Ireland First Division

References

Ireland
1994–95 in Republic of Ireland association football
League of Ireland Premier Division seasons